The Pichi Richi Railway is a  narrow-gauge heritage railway in the southern Flinders Ranges of South Australia between Quorn and Port Augusta. For much of its length the line lies in the picturesque Pichi Richi Pass, where the line was completed in 1879 as work proceeded north to build a railway to the "Red Centre" of Australia – the Central Australia Railway.  

The Commonwealth Railways ran trains through the pass until 1980, when it ceased its by then meagre services. 

In July 1973 the not-for-profit Pichi Richi Railway Preservation Society Inc. was incorporated, initially to ensure conservation of the fine dry stone walls and the bridges in the Pichi Richi Pass. It became evident that the prospect of operating heritage trains was possible and after undertaking restoration of deteriorated sections of the line the Society then tentatively operated its first trains, from 1974. 

By 1979, following further track repairs, trains were able to travel to Stirling North – at that time the western terminus of the line. 

A newly built extension to Port Augusta was opened in 2001. 

The society continues to be managed and staffed by its volunteer members and operates its own restored steam and diesel hauled trains on a variety of services between March to November each year.

Background
The line was built under severe cost restraints as part of the South Australian Railways' Port Augusta and Government Gums Railway. It started in 1878 at Port Augusta, proceeded through the Pichi Richi Pass (being opened at Quorn in 1879), and reached Marree (then named Hergott Springs) in 1884. In keeping with the intention to extend it to become a north–south transcontinental line, it was named the Great Northern Railway in 1882. When the Commonwealth Railways took over operations in 1926 it had the more prosaic name, given a year earlier, Central Australia Railway. Completed as far as Stuart (renamed in 1930 as Alice Springs) near the centre of Australia, the  line never went further north. Nevertheless, it served for a century as a lifeline for isolated outback communities, a vital link for supplies in World War II, and the setting for the famous passenger train, The Ghan. The Pichi Richi section also became the feeder route to the east–west Trans-Australian Railway from 1917 to 1937. It had the steepest gradients of the whole route, necessitated by the refusal of decision makers to heed the advice of surveyors and engineers to stay west of the Flinders Ranges, giving priority instead to servicing promising copper prospects and expected agricultural wealth in the locality. This source of decades of operational nuisance and expense had become, in the lines old age, the source of enjoyment for travellers, as locomotives worked hard to ascend the grades.

The headquarters of the PRRPS is at the Quorn railway station, where restoration and repair work continues to be undertaken by volunteers at the locomotive depot. Trains operate through the Pichi Richi Pass to Woolshed Flat and Port Augusta, and out of Port Augusta to Quorn. 

The volunteer organisation has fully restored a fleet of South Australian Railways (SAR), Commonwealth Railways (CR) and Western Australian Government Railways (WAGR) steam and diesel locomotives, passenger and freight rolling stock.

Pichi Richi (1974) (elevation ), Woolshed Flat (1979) (elevation ) and Stirling North (1999) on the original alignment, and to Port Augusta (2001) on a new alignment between Stirling North and Port Augusta.

Pichi Richi is the name of the pass through which the railway travels and is also the name of the former township located in the Pass, after which the Society is named. The name Pichi Richi is believed to come from the region being a traditional centre in the production of pituri, a mixture of leaves and ash chewed as a stimulant by the First Nations people in Australia.

Current operations
PRRPS continues to expand the type and number of services as more rolling stock and track is restored and rehabilitated.

The Afghan Express is a return trip to Quorn from Port Augusta (78 kilometres return). This train usually consists of Ghan carriages from the 1920s and is often hauled, wherever possible, by an original Ghan steam locomotive, NM25, and recreates the type of travel experienced on the Ghan in the 1930s and 1940s.

A shorter journey, the Pichi Richi Explorer is a return service to Woolshed Flat departing from Quorn (32 kilometres return). Travel on this train is either in South Australian Railway carriages circa 1900 to 1915 hauled by a steam locomotive, or in a 1928 SAR diesel railcar. The use of older SAR rolling stock on this train replicates what it was like to travel by country rail in South Australia in the very early 1900s to the 1960s. Much of this rolling stock was in service until the end of narrow gauge passenger operations by the South Australian Railways. 

Steam Motor Coach No. 1, also known as the “Coffee Pot” is a unique railcar and the last operating example of its type worldwide. Built in 1906, this ornate Edwardian-era steam railcar has been restored by its volunteers. It is used for selected services during the train running season, the SMC carries a small number of passengers (in first and second class) on board for a Coffee Pot Heritage Rail Experience day trip from Quorn to Woolshed Flat and return.

Pichi Richi Railway offers other special services including the occasional "double header" steam trains and the trains and carriages are available for private hire, suiting a range of different occasions from weddings to tour groups.

Major projects
The PRRPS has completed a number of major projects since its inception in 1973. These include return to service of steam locomotives and heritage rolling stock, rebuilding large sections of railway line and permanent way and the restoration of historic buildings.

Rebuild of steam locomotive NM25
Former Commonwealth Railways steam locomotive NM25 was built in 1925 and was used on the narrow gauge train line between Port Augusta and Alice Springs. It is one of only two surviving examples of this class of steam locomotive. NM25 had remained static from 1965 until 1989, when PRRPS acquired it with the intention of restoring it to operational condition. An overhaul commenced in 2000. The locomotive was recommissioned on 26 April 2003.

Track extension to Port Augusta

History of the project

During the Commonwealth Railways era (from 1937 to 1957), the train line between Stirling North and Port Augusta was dual gauge. Narrow gauge served the line to Quorn and the standard gauge, which branched at Stirling North, was for the line to Port Pirie and also to Marree. A new standard gauge line to Marree was built in the 1950s on a new route west of the Pichi Richi Pass, with the purpose of bypassing the narrow gauge section of the Central Australia Railway to Marree, through Quorn and Hawker. The narrow gauge component of the section dual gauge track between Stirling North and Port Augusta was removed once the standard gauge line to Marree was in full operation, and the narrow gauge route from Hawker to Marree had been closed and removed. This meant that the remaining narrow gauge line from Stirling North to Hawker via Quorn was now isolated. On the occasions that a narrow gauge train needed to travel to Port Augusta or to Marree, the train would need to utilise a piggy back system. This arrangement saw the entire narrow gauge train loaded on top of a standard gauge train of flatcars and transported via standard gauge, then unloaded at the destination on to the existing narrow gauge.

This work included the complete replacement of sleepers and rail, re-timbering of several bridges and the construction of a turning triangle at Stirling North. Part of the $1.35 million Pichi Richi Railway Development Plan project, it was completed in 1999. The extension was opened on 24 October 1999 by former Deputy Prime Minister of Australia Tim Fischer.

It was announced in 2000 that funding was available through the State Government of South Australia, and the Port Augusta City Council to extend the train line from Stirling North in to Port Augusta railway station. However, there were significant works required for to complete this project.

Crossing the standard gauge
Because the existing narrow gauge between Stirling North and Port Augusta had been removed many years earlier, the challenge for the PRRPS was to develop an effective means of reinstating the narrow gauge in to Port Augusta. The greatest aspect to this challenge was how to cross over what remained of the standard gauge line to Marree, which had since been truncated at Telford Cut coal mine near Leigh Creek with the opening of the newer standard gauge line from Tarcoola to Alice Springs in 1980. This line to Leigh Creek was exclusively used for transporting coal from Leigh Creek to Northern Power Station, and branched off the main standard gauge network at Stirling North. Many options for crossing this line were investigated, including a draw bridge arrangement, diamond crossovers and an underpass. The final decision was an underpass, passing below the Leigh Creek coal train line, which greatly reduced the amount of safe working interfacing with the standard gauge line. Diagram.

Project completion
The remainder of the narrow gauge line was constructed parallel to the standard gauge into Port Augusta, arriving at Platform 2 at Port Augusta station. The rail for this project was sourced from the dismantled Cambrai to Apamurra railway line in South Australia's Murray Mallee region. A turntable relocated from Kapunda was installed near the station, and a depot and sheds were constructed next to the Port Augusta station for housing a locomotive and rolling stock for Pichi Richi Railway operations originating at Port Augusta.

Other route extension works
Other works included:
constructing six turnouts at Port Augusta to provide a run-around loop and access to the storage shed and turntable
laying about 11,500 redgum and steel sleepers
using 30,000 second-hand dogspikes, 10,000 screwspikes and 5,200 fishbolts
transporting, distributing and tamping  of track ballast
designing, manufacturing, transporting and installing 13 large precast concrete culvert crowns and base sections for the underpass – achieved in 60 hours to avoid disrupting coal trains from Leigh Creek
installing about 1600 pieces of pin-crib walling to the underpass at Stirling North.

The extension was officially opened 15 September 2001 by the local state MP, Graham Gunn, the then state Tourism Minister Joan Hall, and Port Augusta Mayor Joy Baluch.

The extension to Port Augusta won the 2002 Permanent Way Institute (SA Section) Trackwork Achievement Award

Other projects

Significant projects completed by Pichi Richi Railway in recent years include:

overhaul and return to service of WAGR steam locomotive W934
overhaul and return to service of WAGR steam locomotive W916 (rebuilt as W22)
rebuild of several original Commonwealth Railways narrow-gauge carriages, including:
NABPA class passenger carriage, numbers 25, 26 and 27
NIA class passenger carriage number 36 – distinguished as the vehicle that in World War II carried United States General Douglas MacArthur, his wife, son and amah from Alice Springs to Adelaide via Quorn after they had escaped the Japanese advance of the Philippines (it was at Terowie that MacArthur made his famous declaration, "I came through and I shall return" from the end platform of the car)
NSS class special service observation carriage number 34, used by the Duke of Gloucester on a royal train during his 1934 visit to Australia
 NYAB class composite brake van carriage number 15
restoration of SAR Brill railcar trailer 305
restoration and return to service of motor inspection car MIC 126, a 1937 Morris 25 Morris motor vehicle that runs on railway wheels
restoration of SAR refreshment carriage Light
rebuild of SAR passenger carriage number 5
tyre replacement and crank journal machining of loco W934.

Ongoing projects:
rebuild of SAR steam locomotive Yx141
cylinder profiling and new pistons NM25
acquisition of former SAR 830 class locomotives 843 & 846
tyre repairs and bogie overhaul NT76
rebuild of SAR Long Tom passenger carriage number 470.

Future projects:
tyre replacement on W22 (W916)
restoration of SAR locomotive T186 to working order.
overhaul of SAR locomotive 402 to working order in collaboration with the Zig Zag Railway.

Rolling stock

Motive power
, the society's operational motive power was three steam locomotives, two diesel locomotives, a diesel railcar and a steam motor coach, among a total fleet as follows:

Carriages
Restored carriages were as follows:

Awards
Pichi Richi Railway has received many significant awards, including the following:

Visiting operators
PRRPS has hosted vehicles of other heritage railway operators.

The first occasion, in October 1981, was when Steamtown ran a train to Quorn. This was the last steam-hauled train and last passenger train to travel on the Peterborough–Quorn railway line all the way to Quorn. Although the Quorn station yard and line to Peterborough was still under the control of Australian National at this time, the Steamtown trip became the last steam-hauled train and last passenger train to travel the entire Peterborough to Quorn railway line. Steamtown's ex WAGR Pmr720 was the only Pacific type steam locomotive to ever visit Quorn.

The Australian Society of Section Car Operators negotiated an access agreement with PRRPS and subsequently its members used the railway between Quorn and Stirling North to operate their section cars on the weekend of 22 and 23 March 2003.

Former BHAS locomotive "Peronne" and Short Tom carriage 144 from the National Railway Museum have operated on Pichi Richi Railway.

References

External links
Official Pichi Richi Railway Preservation Society website
30-part series covering the rebuild of steam locomotive NM25

Adelaide-Darwin railway corridor
Heritage railways in Australia
Rail transport in South Australia
3 ft 6 in gauge railways in Australia
1973 establishments in Australia